Moore High School is a public high school located in Moore, Montana.  It is the only high school in the Moore School District.

References

Public high schools in Montana
Fergus County, Montana